This is a discography of the Scottish musician Jim Kerr which includes one studio album and three hit singles. Kerr rose to fame during the 1980s as frontman of the popular rock group Simple Minds, who achieved their number one hit single with "Ballad of the Streets EP" and also achieved five number one studio albums. In 2010 Kerr embarked on a solo career and released his debut solo album Lostboy! AKA Jim Kerr which spawned three singles "Shadowland", "Refugee" and "She Fell In Love With Silence".

Studio albums

Singles

Other charted songs

See also 
Simple Minds discography

References

External links 
Penny Black Music  Interview with Jim Kerr, May 2010

Discographies of British artists
Rock music discographies